Joël Eric Bailly Damahou (born 28 January 1987) is an Ivorian former professional footballer who played as a defensive midfielder.

Career
On 5 March 2019, Damahou signed with Armenian club Alashkert, being released by the club three months later on 5 June 2019.

He was appointed technical director at Cypriot club Aris Limassol in 2021.

Career statistics

References

External links

1987 births
Living people
Footballers from Abidjan
Ivorian footballers
French sportspeople of Ivorian descent
Association football midfielders
Israeli Premier League players
Nemzeti Bajnokság I players
Ligue 2 players
3. Liga players
Cypriot First Division players
Football League (Greece) players
Liga Leumit players
Kuwait Premier League players
Armenian Premier League players
Paris FC players
FC Mantois 78 players
Borussia Mönchengladbach II players
Kickers Offenbach players
Bnei Sakhnin F.C. players
Maccabi Haifa F.C. players
Hapoel Ra'anana A.F.C. players
Debreceni VSC players
Tours FC players
Pafos FC players
Al-Arabi SC (Kuwait) players
Trikala F.C. players
Nea Salamis Famagusta FC players
Hapoel Acre F.C. players
FC Alashkert players
Aris Limassol FC players
Ivorian expatriate footballers
Ivorian expatriate sportspeople in France
Expatriate footballers in France
Ivorian expatriate sportspeople in Germany
Expatriate footballers in Germany
Ivorian expatriate sportspeople in Israel
Expatriate footballers in Israel
Ivorian expatriate sportspeople in Hungary
Expatriate footballers in Hungary
Ivorian expatriate sportspeople in Cyprus
Expatriate footballers in Cyprus
Ivorian expatriate sportspeople in Kuwait
Expatriate footballers in Kuwait
Ivorian expatriate sportspeople in Greece
Expatriate footballers in Greece
Ivorian expatriate sportspeople in Armenia
Expatriate footballers in Armenia